Damir Novosel is the founder and president of Quanta Technology, Raleigh, North Carolina. Novosel got his PhD in electrical engineering from Mississippi State University where he was a Fulbright scholar, after obtaining bachelor's degree from the University of Tuzla and master's degree from University of Zagreb.

He was a Vice President of ABB Automation Products, President of IEEE Power & Energy Society, and has authored or coauthored more than 100 articles in transactions, journals, and proceedings. He holds 16 U.S. and international patents. Novosel became a Fellow of the IEEE in 2003, and a member of the National Academy of Engineering in 2014.

References 

Fellow Members of the IEEE
Living people
Bosnian American
Members of the United States National Academy of Engineering
1957 births
Mississippi State University alumni
University of Zagreb alumni